Watch Out! is a 1987 album released by R&B singer Patrice Rushen. This album was the only album Rushen released with Arista Records after leaving Elektra Records.  The album produced several R&B hits for Rushen.

The upbeat title single "Watch Out" was a Billboard top ten R&B hit, also a top twenty dance hit. Other songs such as: "Somewhere," "Anything Can Happen," "All My Love," "Till She's out of Your Mind," "Come Back to Me" and "Tender Lovin" were also popular with her fans.

Track listing
"Watch Out!" (Patrice Rushen, Sheree Brown) - 5:26
"Breakin' All The Rules" (Freddie Washington, Patrice Rushen) - 4:55
"Long Time Coming" (Antonina Armato, Richard Feldman) - 4:53
"All My Love" (Freddie Washington, Patrice Rushen, Tony Haynes) - 4:47
"Somewhere" (Freddie Washington, Jackie English) - 5:09
"Anything Can Happen" (Alan Roy Scott, Lotti Golden, Michael Jay) - 5:03
"Burnin'" (Patrice Rushen, Wayne Vaughn) - 5:05
"Till She's Out Of Your Mind" (Clint Holmes, Patrice Rushen) - 4:11
"Come Back to Me" (Lynn Davis, Patrice Rushen) - 5:53
"Tender Lovin'" (Patrice Rushen, Roy Galloway) - 5:03

In addition to numerous remixes for the three singles, "Watch Out!" had a non-album B-side, "Over the Phone" (Patrice Rushen/Angela Rushen-Ehigiator).

Personnel 
 Patrice Rushen – lead vocals, backing vocals (1, 2, 4, 7-10), keyboards (1, 2, 4), synthesizer programming (1, 2, 4, 7-10), drum programming (1, 2, 4, 7-10), arrangements (1, 2, 4, 7-10), synthesizers (7-10), synth solo (7), acoustic piano (8), keyboard bass (9, 10), acoustic piano solo (10)
 Jerry Knight – all instruments (3, 5, 6), programming (3, 5, 6), synthesizer programming (3, 5, 6), drum programming (3, 5, 6), backing vocals (3, 5, 6), arrangements (3, 5, 6)
 Aaron Zigman – all instruments (3, 5, 6), programming (3, 5, 6), synthesizer programming (3, 5, 6), drum programming (3, 5, 6), arrangements (3, 5, 6)
 Greg Moore – guitars (1, 2, 4, 7, 10)
 James Harrah – guitars (8)
 Freddie Washington – bass (1, 2, 4, 9)
 Nathan East – bass (8)
 Rayford Griffin – drums (4, 10)
 Ricky Lawson – drums (7, 9)
 John Robinson – drums (8)
 Terral Santiel – percussion (1, 2, 4)
 Paulinho da Costa – percussion (4, 9, 10)
 Larry Williams – saxophone solo (5)
 Justo Almario – saxophones (2, 8, 10)
 Jeff Clayton – saxophones (2, 8, 10)
 George Bohanon – trombone (2, 8, 10)
 Maurice Spears – trombone (2, 8, 10)
 Oscar Brashear – trumpet (2, 8, 10)
 Raymond Lee Brown – trumpet (2, 8, 10)
 Lynn Davis – backing vocals (1, 2, 4, 7-10)
 Roy Galloway – backing vocals (1, 2, 4, 7-10)
 Charles Mims Jr. – backing vocals (1, 2)
 Andrea Robinson – backing vocals (8)

Production 
 Patrice Rushen – producer (1, 2, 4, 7-10), executive producer (1, 2, 4, 7-10)
 Charles Mims Jr. – producer (1, 2, 4, 7-10)
 Jerry Knight – producer (3, 5, 6)
 Aaron Zigman – producer (3, 5, 6)
 Clive Davis – executive producer (3, 5, 6)
 Peter Chaikin – recording (1, 2, 4, 7-10)
 Richard McKernan – recording (1, 2, 4, 7-10)
 Bobby Brooks – recording (3, 5, 6)
 Mark Dayton – recording (3, 5, 6)
 Daren Klein – recording (3, 5, 6)
 Gary Wagner – recording (3, 5, 6)
 Barney Perkins – mixing (1, 4, 7, 9, 10)
 Paul Lani – mixing (2)
 Mick Guzauski – mixing (3, 5, 6)
 Humberto Gatica – mixing (8)
 Jennie Ciruillo – assistant engineer
 Keith Cohen – assistant engineer
 Jim Dineen – assistant engineer 
 Jeff Hoppenstand – assistant engineer
 Stan Katayama – assistant engineer 
 Laura Livingston – assistant engineer 
 Elliot Peters – assistant engineer 
 Ray Pyle – assistant engineer 
 Gloria Robertson – assistant engineer 
 Philip Walters – assistant engineer
 Doug Sax – mastering 
 Todd Grace – keyboard technician 
 Ria Lewerke – art direction 
 Maude Gilman – design
 Margery Greenspan – design 
 Matthew Rolston – photography 
 Susan Joseph – management 
 Grand Trine Management – management company

Studios
 Recorded at The Crib, Cherokee Studios and Lion Share Recording (Los Angeles, CA); Rock Steady, Baby O'Recorders, Conway Studios and Larrabee Sound Studios (Hollywood, CA); Yamaha Studios (Glendale, CA); Can-Am Recorders (Tarzana, CA).
 Mastered at The Mastering Lab (Hollywood, CA).

Charts

Singles

References

1987 albums
Patrice Rushen albums
Arista Records albums